Alby Black was an Australian rugby league footballer who played in the 1920s and 1930s.  He played for Glebe, Balmain and South Sydney.  He played in a number of positions including halfback, centre and wing.

Playing career
Black began his first grade career with Glebe and made his debut for the club in Round 5 of the 1928 season.  Black played for Glebe at a time when the clubs fortune started to decline and he was a member of the Glebe side who played their last ever game as a first grade side against North Sydney which finished in a 24–24 draw at North Sydney Oval.  After Glebe were controversially voted out of the NSWRL premiership, Black joined Glebe's rivals Balmain where he spent two seasons.  In 1932, Black joined Souths and in his first season at the club was a member of the side which defeated Western Suburbs 19–12 in the grand final with Black scoring a try.  Black played one more season for Souths in 1933 and then retired.

References

South Sydney Rabbitohs players
Balmain Tigers players
Glebe rugby league players
Australian rugby league players
New South Wales rugby league team players
Rugby league centres
Rugby league wingers
Rugby league players from New South Wales